Herel is a surname. Notable people with the surname include:

Joseph Herel (born 1953), Slovak footballer and manager
Petr Herel (born 1943), Czechoslovakia-born Australian artist
Ronnie Herel, British DJ and radio personality

See also
Harel
Herrell
Merel